Maebong station is a railway station in Ŭnsan County, South P'yŏngan Province, North Korea. It is the terminus of the Maebong Line of the Korean State Railway.

References

Railway stations in North Korea